Atul Bakshi (born 2 September 1956) is an Indian glass artist who specialises stained glass, blown glass, and cast glass. His scope of work ranges from restoring stained glass windows and panels to executing commissioned works for private homes and businesses.

Life and career

Bakshi was born in Amritsar in  Punjab, India. He is the great-grandson of Ganda Singh Datt and son of Bakshi Hardev Singh. Bakshi completed his high school education at St. Francis School in Amritsar. He then enrolled in the Merchant Navy at the T.S. Rajendra in Mumbai from 1974 until 1976. His travels in the Navy exposed him to different arts and cultures, and this eventually led him to quit his job of 23 years to pursue his interest in the glassmaking.

In 1984, Bakshi studied the technique of modern stained glass in Australia. He returned home to set up his own studio for coldworking, Studio Lead Light, in Vasant Kunj, Delhi. He also works with a team at Firozabad, Uttar Pradesh for glassblowing and casting. His work is influenced by Bertil Vallien.

Exhibitions

Group exhibition, Art Spice Gallery, The Metropolitan Hotel, New Delhi, 2012
Group exhibition, AUDI Gurgaon, Gurgaon, 2012
Group installation, residence of the Swedish ambassador in India, 2010
"Atul Bakshi - Glass," solo exhibition, Cymroza Art Gallery, Mumbai, 2010
"In Mystic Moments," solo exhibition, Epicentre, Apparel House, Gurgaon, 2008
Group exhibition, India Habitat Centre, New Delhi, 2006
Group exhibition, Linkoping, Sweden, 2006
Exhibition, Vis-a Vis Art and Design Centre, New Delhi, 1999

References
http://www.dnaindia.com/lifestyle/1365117/report-im-a-slave-to-glass-atul-bakshi
https://web.archive.org/web/20140608140626/http://paper.hindustantimes.com/epaper/viewer.aspx
http://epaper.timesofindia.com/Default/Layout/Includes/TOINEW/ArtWin.asp?From=Archive&Source=Page&Skin=TOINEW&BaseHref=TOIM%2F2010%2F08%2F20&ViewMode=HTML&PageLabel=49&EntityId=Ar04901&AppName=1
http://www.business-standard.com/article/beyond-business/glass-as-art-106081201021_1.html
http://www.bombayharbor.com/Company/46668/Studio_Lead_Light.html
http://articles.economictimes.indiatimes.com/2006-08-27/news/27420259_1_provident-fund-glass-artist-vivid-colours
https://web.archive.org/web/20130728120741/http://ofindianorigin.co.uk/art-2/raise-your-glass-for/
https://web.archive.org/web/20130722091445/http://expressindia.indianexpress.com/fe/daily/19991209/fle05077.html
http://www.tribuneindia.com/2013/20130424/ttlife1.htm
https://web.archive.org/web/20130722080702/http://sagarmediainc.wordpress.com/2012/11/01/3876/
http://newindianexpress.com/cities/hyderabad/article1320715.ece

https://web.archive.org/web/20130722105227/http://www.swedishchamber.in/events/event-history/details/a-perfect-ending-to-the-nobel-memorial-week-the-grand-nobel-party

http://mobilepaper.timesofindia.com/mobile.aspx?article=yes&pageid=38&sectid=edid=&edlabel=TOIM&mydateHid=3 April 2010&pubname=Times+of+India+-+Mumbai&edname=&articleid=Ar03800&publabel=TOI
https://web.archive.org/web/20130409211419/http://anandfoundation.com/inter_atul.asp

1956 births
Living people
Indian contemporary artists
Artists from Amritsar
Stained glass artists and manufacturers